Yekimovskoye is a rural locality (a village) in Nikolskoye Rural Settlement, Sheksninsky District, Vologda Oblast, Russia. The population was 15 as of 2002.

Geography 
Yekimovskoye is located 4 km south of Sheksna (the district's administrative centre) by road. Chagino is the nearest rural locality.

References 

Rural localities in Sheksninsky District